CJ ENM Entertainment Div (Hangul: 씨제이이엔엠 엔터테인먼트 부문), formerly known as CJ E&M, is a South Korean entertainment and mass media company created by CJ Group in 2011 and later became a division of CJ ENM since July 2018.

History
CJ E&M was established as 
O Media Holdings in 2010.

In 2011, the company renamed to CJ E&M (short for CJ Entertainment & Media) following the merger of seven CJ Group company : CJ Media, On-Media, Mnet Media, CJ Entertainment, CJ Games, CJ Internet, and the media division of CJ O Shopping.

In 2016, CJ E&M sets up its South East Asia headquarter in Hong Kong in a bid to expand the group's major development plan in Asia.

In 2018, CJ E&M established an office in Singapore to advance the company's channel distribution and advertising sales support in the region. In May 2018, it was announced that CJ E&M and  CJ O Shopping merged into new company CJ ENM (CJ Entertainment and Merchandising), which will be launched on July 1.

Business

Present
Media Content – operating as a media company and television program production.
 Mnet in South Korea, Japan and America
 M2
 Studio CHOOM
 tvN family of networks
 tvN in South Korea and Asia
 tvN Drama (formerly OtvN)
 tvN Show (formerly XTM and XtvN)
 tvN Story (formerly known as the first iteration of Olive)
 tvN D (web content division)
 tvN Sports (formerly known as the second iteration of Olive)
 tvN Movies (currently only in Malaysia and Indonesia as linear channel, although they provide VOD service across Southeast Asia & Hong Kong)
 OCN family of networks
 OCN
 OCN Movies (formerly Home CGV and Channel CGV)
 OCN Movies 2 (formerly OCN Action, Super Action and OCN Thrills)
 OCN Studio (content division)
 CATCH ON family of networks
 CATCH ON 1
 CATCH ON 2
 CATCH ON VDO (On-demand)
 Chunghwa TV
 Tooniverse
 DIA TV
 UXN
 Studio Dragon
 Culture Depot
 GT:st
 Gill Pictures
 Hwa&Dam Pictures
 KPJ Corporation
 Studio Dragon Japan (Japan; co-owned with Line Digital Frontier and CJ ENM)
 Mega Monster (5.86%)*
 Merrycow Creative (19%)*
 Next Scene (19.98%)*
 CJ ENM Studios
 Blaad Studio
 Bon Factory Worldwide
 Egg Is Coming
 JS Pictures
 AStory (10.71%)*
 Studio Take One
 Fifth Season (previously Endeavor Content; Endeavor owned minority shares)
 CJ ENM Digital Studio
 The Bob Studio
 Sapiens Studio
 Studio Waffle

Film – operating as a film production company, film publishing house, film investment production.
 CJ Entertainment
 Cinema Service
 Dexter Studios (5%)*
 Filament Pictures
 Skydance Media (unknown percentage; based in the United States)*
 CJ ENM Studios
 JK Film
 M Makers
 Moho Film
 Yong Film Inc.
 Studio Dragon
 Movie Rock (20%)*
 True CJ Creations - A joint venture with the True Corporation of Thailand, mainly used to create Thai adaptations of Studio Dragon shows.

Music – operating as an artists management, record label, music production company, event management, concert production company, music publishing house and entertainment investment company.

Management
 143 Entertainment 
 Wake One
 AOMG
 H1ghr Music
 HighUp Entertainment 
 Amoeba Culture
 Swing Entertainment
 Lapone Entertainment (based in Japan, co-managed by Yoshimoto Kogyo)
 Belift Lab (co-managed by Hybe Corporation)
 Biscuit Entertainment 
 KQ Entertainment 
 MODHAUS 
 Blockberry Creative

Distribution
 Stone Music Entertainment
 Genie Music (15.35%)*

Convention – operating as a concert production company, festival production and producing award event.
 Mnet Asian Music Awards
 KCON
 Valley Rock Music & Arts Festival
 Get It Beauty CON
 OLive CON

Performing Arts – operating as a theatrical production company.

Animation – operating as an animation production company, animation publishing house, animation investment production and merchandising animation content.
 InfinityOne Comics Entertainment
 Studio Bazooka
 CJ ENM Studios
 Cartoon Family

Media Solution – developing and producing marketing content and providing integrated marketing solutions.

Former
 CJ E&M Game Division – publisher and developer of games – spun off in 2014 as an independent company named CJ Netmarble (later renamed as Netmarble*).
 Eccho Rights – based in Sweden – it later brought by Night Train Media.

* denotes a company wherein CJ ENM or any of its subsidiaries has a minority interest.

Controversies
In April 2015, CJ E&M was accused of mobilising young employees to fill the seats of its annual general meeting (AGM) of shareholders in an attempt to silence shareholders.

In October 2015, CJ E&M and its US-based subsidiary CJ E&M America were sued by Seoul-based music agency DFSB Kollective for copyright infringement and violation of the Digital Millennium Copyright Act in the Central District Court of California, with the latter seeking to get $50 million. Responding to the suit, CJ E&M accused DFSB of being unhappy on the final decision on a similar lawsuit filed in Seoul in 2011. The first trial was set for 1 March 2016 after the court rejected CJ E&M's motion to dismiss the case.

See also
 CJ Group

Notes

References

External links
 
 

 
EandM
Mass media companies established in 2010
Companies listed on KOSDAQ
Entertainment companies of South Korea
Mass media companies of South Korea
2018 mergers and acquisitions
South Korean companies established in 2010
2018 disestablishments in South Korea